Loki K. Gordon (born January 20, 1958) is an artist and founder and co-owner of Marrakech Henna Art Cafe in Marrakech, Morocco. She is also founder and president of Six Degrees Consortium, a 501(c)3 organization dedicated to the creation and dissemination of art that addresses compelling social issues and that builds bridges across cultures. She is also Founder and President of El Fenn Maroc, a NGO based in Marrakech, Morocco and dedicated to supporting artists in Morocco. She is known for The Katrina Collection, her series of mixed media assemblages which incorporates debris from the massive hurricane which ravaged the Mississippi Gulf Coast in August 2005, for The Labat Project, a piece of which has been acquired by the Smithsonian Institution, and for Six Degrees: West to East" which addresses the gulf between the western and Islamic worlds.

Born and raised on the Northern Plains, Gordon settled near Bay St. Louis, Mississippi in 1991. Gordon introduced her first mixed media series in 2001. One of her major works from this period is the 8' by 10' biographical art quilt "Labat: A Creole Legacy" which has been acquired by the Smithsonian Institution for inclusion into their permanent collection.
In August 2005, Hurricane Katrina obliterated her home and studio in the small community of Clermont Harbor, Mississippi.  With her tools and supplies destroyed by 140 mile per hour winds and a 43-foot storm surge, Gordon resourcefully returned to work using the only materials available to her.  She began collecting debris and transforming it into mixed media assemblages.  Her "Katrina Collection" has been exhibited in dozens of venues around the nation.  Private collectors of her work include President and First Lady Michelle Obama,former President and First Lady Jimmy and Rosalynn Carter, Good Morning America's Robin Roberts,
singer Faith Hill, and ESPN announcer Jon Miller. Pieces of The Katrina Collection may be found in the public collections of the Mississippi Humanities Council, Thea Foundation and William J. Clinton Foundation's Art Across Arkansas, Hancock Medical Center, Virginia Commonwealth University, University of Kentucky, University of Southern Mississippi and the Safeco Corporate Collection, as well as two museums in South Dakota.

Media coverage and exhibitions
Gordon's work has been covered by media across the country. In 2005, her work was featured by MSNBC.  She was interviewed on National Public Radio's All Things Considered in 2006, and her work was featured on the websites of the Associated Press and CBS that same year.  She has appeared in two documentaries and on Mississippi Public Broadcasting.  "The Art of the Storm" (2006) follows the lives of several Bay St. Louis artists as they struggle to rebuild their lives and resume their careers in the wake of the worst natural disaster to hit American soil.  "Mississippi Son" (2007) by Emmy award winner Don Wilson examines the effects of the storm upon the cultural milieu of the coast.  Gordon's interview with Hannah Leatherbury of the Southern Arts Federation was also podcast in 2007. Mississippi Roads, a long-running television program from Mississippi Public Broadcasting, featured Gordon's work in 2008, as did the Christian Science Monitor and MPB's Southern Expressions.  Magazines which have featured articles about her work include Art Gulf Coast, Going Coastal, (both no longer publishing) South Mississippi Living, and Mississippi Magazine. In 2006, her work was included in Walking on Water, a book of Mississippi artists.  Gordon has also produced a short documentary on her work, narrated by ESPN personality Jon Miller.

Major exhibitions of Gordon's work have been hosted by the South Arkansas Art Center (2006); the Museum of the Southwest (2007); Sumner Dene Gallery in Albuquerque (2008-2013); Serenity Gallery in Bay St. Louis, Mississippi (1999–2004); Quarter Moon Gallery in Bay St Louis, Mississippi (2004–2005); Atelier Gallery in Ashevelle NC and Charleston SC; Brown's Fine Art in Jackson, MS; and Gallery 220 in Bay St Louis, Mississippi (2005–2013).  She has had nearly 100 solo shows in various locations, and has participated in over 70 group exhibitions, including the premiere art exhibit at the William J. Clinton Presidential Library and "Impact on the Gulf" by The Culture Project in New York City.  In 2007 she was invited by the Mississippi Arts Commission to be one of several featured artists at the Southern Governors Convention, and in 2008, she was selected to exhibit in The Katrina Museum, located in Gulfport, Mississippi. In 2009, 2010 and 2012, a 4-month exhibit of her work was installed at the University of Southern Mississippi's Katrina Research Center. Gordon is currently represented by Sumner & Dene Gallery in Albuquerque, New Mexico; Brown's Fine Art in Jackson, Mississippi; Atelier gallery in Asheville NC and Gallery 220 in Bay St Louis, Mississippi.

Grants and awards
Gordon has been awarded grants from the New York-based Pollock-Krasner Foundation (2005), Gottlieb Foundation (2006) and Andy Warhol Foundation (2006), as well as from the Contemporary Arts Center in New Orleans (2006). She was selected to receive the 2007 Artist Fellowship from the Mississippi Arts Commission as well as several grants. Other honors include commissions from the Mississippi Humanities Council (2005 and 2006); a commission from the State of Mississippi (2006); the annual "Spotlight on Success" event by the March of Dimes (2007); commissions from the national organization Architects, Designers and Planners for Social Responsibility (2007); commission from the American Red Cross (2008), a fellowship from the Mississippi Arts Commission; commission from Habitat for Humanity (2008) and from the Greater Jackson Arts Council (2011) .  In 2006, she was selected to participate in Southern Artistry, a joint effort of Southern Arts Federation and the Center for Arts Management & Technology at Carnegie Mellon. She may be found on the Mississippi Arts Commission Artist Roster and regularly teaches workshops in paper collage.

Other notable achievements
Gordon has been an active contributor to many charitable organizations and has given free presentations to groups around the nation, including Elderhostel, Job Core, Augsberg College, Northwestern State University's Creole Heritage Center, New Hope Learning Center, several groups of schoolchildren, Katrina relief organizations, and various art organizations. In 2004, she was invited to address the Mississippi House of Representatives on The Labat Project. She teaches workshops for both children and adults in her collage/assemblage techniques, and has acted as co-organizer in shows across the country, including those in Moss Beach, California; Minneapolis, Minnesota; Richmond, Virginia and several locations in Mississippi.  She is a founding member of The Artists of 220 Main, an award-winning gallery in Bay St Louis which opened its doors just five weeks after Hurricane Katrina; and also of The Arts Hancock County, where she served as Publicity Chair and Board Member from 2004-2008. Memberships include Del Ray Artisans, South Arkansas Arts Center, South Arts Federation, The Arts Hancock County, Ocean Springs Art Association, and the Museum of the Southwest.  Gordon has also written on the arts for several publications, including Art Gulf Coast and South Mississippi Living. In 2014, Gordon and her partner Rachid Karkouch opened Marrakech Henna Art Cafe in Marrakech, Morocco. The cafe hosts exhibitions of work by artists from many countries and also serves as a home for El Fenn Maroc, a NGO founded by Gordon and whose mission is to support artists in Morocco.

External links

 (http://marrakechhennaartcafe.com)
 Katrina Collection Blog
 Additional Blog
 Additional Blog

References 

1958 births
American artists
Living people
Artists from Mississippi
People from Hancock County, Mississippi